Ulvis Katlaps (March 3, 1968 – August 20, 2013) was a Latvian professional ice hockey defenceman. He played in the Soviet Championship League for five seasons with the Dynamo Riga.
Katlaps played two seasons in the United States with the University of Wisconsin in NCAA hockey league. He graduated from Wisconsin with a degree in journalism and worked as a trader with Skylands Capital. After his hockey career he coached junior hockey with Wisconsin AAA and Milwaukee Jr. Admirals.

In August 2013, he was diagnosed with an advanced stage of stomach cancer and died on August 20 at the age of 45. Katlaps is survived by wife Kelly and two children.

Career statistics

International

References

External links

1968 births
2013 deaths
Deaths from stomach cancer
Ice hockey people from Riga
Latvian ice hockey defencemen
Wisconsin Badgers men's ice hockey players
Sportspeople from Waukesha, Wisconsin
Sportspeople from the Milwaukee metropolitan area
Latvian ice hockey coaches
Expatriate ice hockey players in the United States
Latvian expatriate ice hockey people
Latvian expatriate sportspeople in the United States
Soviet ice hockey defencemen